Gough is a surname. The surname probably derives from the Welsh  (English: "red"), given as a nickname to someone with red hair or a red complexion or as a reduced form of the Irish McGough which itself is an Anglicized form of Gaelic , a patronymic from the personal name  (variant ), "horseman", both derivatives of Irish  "horse".

Occasionally used as a first or middle name:
 Edward Gough Whitlam, known as Gough Whitlam, Australian Prime Minister.

Notable people with the surname include:

Alfred Gough, American screenwriter and producer, co-creator of Smallville
Antony Gough, New Zealand businessman and property developer
Austin Gough, American football player
Bobby Gough (born 1949), English footballer
Charles Gough (disambiguation), a number of people
Charles Frederick Howard Gough (1901–1977), British Territorial Army officer, company director and politician
Charles John Stanley Gough, British soldier and recipient of the Victoria Cross
Darren Gough (born 1970), English cricketer and ballroom dancer
Denise Gough (born 1980), Irish actress
Doris Gough Boyd (1888–1960), Australian artist
Douglas Gough (born 1941), British astronomer, Leverhulme Emeritus Fellow at the University of Cambridge
Frank Gough (1898–1980), Australian cricketer
Frederick Foster Gough, British Protestant Christian missionary
Henry Gough (1649–1724), Sheriff of Staffordshire, MP
Hubert Gough, British World War I general
Hugh Henry Gough (1833–1909), Anglo-Irish soldier and recipient of the Victoria Cross
Ian Gough, Welsh rugby player
John Gough (disambiguation), a number of people
Laurie Gough, Canadian-American travel writer
Martyn Gough (chaplain) (born 1966), British Anglican priest and military chaplain
Michael Gough (1916–2011), British actor
Michael Gough (archaeologist) (1916–1973), British archaeologist
 Michael Gough (cricketer) (born 1979), English cricketer and umpire
Michael Gough (voice actor) (born 1956), American voice actor
Ray Gough (born 1938), Northern Irish footballer
Richard Gough (disambiguation), a number of people
Robert Gough (actor), English actor
 Robert Gough (priest), Irish Anglican priest
Sandra Gough, English actress
Stephen Gough, British pro-nudity activist known as the "Naked Rambler"
Stephen Gough (footballer), Irish footballer
Stephen Gough (politician), Canadian politician
Stephen Gough (speed skater), Canadian skater
Viscount Gough, a United Kingdom peerage successively held by:
Hugh Gough, 1st Viscount Gough (1779–1869)
George Gough, 2nd Viscount Gough (1815–1895)
Hugh Gough, 3rd Viscount Gough (1849–1919)
Hugh Gough, 4th Viscount Gough (1892–1951)
Shane Gough, 5th Viscount Gough (born 1941)

See also
The Gough-Calthorpe family

References

English-language surnames
Anglicised Welsh-language surnames